Walter Novo Estrela (born 20 November 1967) is an Angolan footballer. He played in one match for the Angola national football team in 1996. He was also named in Angola's squad for the 1996 African Cup of Nations tournament.

References

1967 births
Living people
Angolan footballers
Angola international footballers
1996 African Cup of Nations players
Association football defenders
People from Namibe Province